Bazhenov (masculine) is a Russian surname. Its feminine form is Bazhenova

Notable people with the surname include:

Bazhenov
 Alexandre Bazhenov (born 1981), Russian racing cyclist
 Evgeny Bazhenov (also known as BadComedian, born 1991), YouTuber and film critic
 Nikita Bazhenov (born 1985), Russian footballer
 Timofey Bazhenov (born 1976), Russian journalist and politician
 Vasili Bazhenov (1737–1799), (c. 1737–1799), Russian neoclassical architect, graphic artist, architectural theorist and educator
 Viktor Bazhenov (born 1946), Soviet fencer
 Vsevolod Bazhenov (1909–1986), Soviet Russian painter

Bazhenova
 Nadezhda Bazhenova (born 1978), Russian athlete and triple-jumper

Other uses 
 Bazhenov Formation a geological formation in Siberia, Russia, which contains large reserves of unconventional oil

See also
Bazhenovo, name of some rural localities (selos) in Bashkortostan, Russia

Russian-language surnames